This list of LGBT ambassadors of the United States includes ambassadors of the United States who publicly identified as lesbian, gay, bisexual, transgender or otherwise part of the LGBT community at the time of their appointment. This list includes ambassadors to individual nations of the world, to international organizations (also known as permanent representatives), and ambassadors-at-large.

Ambassadors are nominated by the president of the United States and confirmed by the Senate. Ambassadors serve "at the pleasure of the president", meaning they can be dismissed at any time.

List

See also 
 List of the first LGBT holders of political offices in the United States

References

External links
 America's LGBT Ambassadors: Global Trade Will Lift Up LGBT Lives, The White House

 

Lists of American LGBT people